Abies chensiensis, the Shensi fir, is a fir native to Gansu, Hubei, Sichuan, Tibet, Yunnan in China, and Arunachal Pradesh in India. It was first described by Philippe Édouard Léon Van Tieghem in 1892.

Description

Tallest tree 

Varieties and synonyms 

Abies chensiensis varieties and its synonyms:
Abies chensiensis var. chensiensis

Abies chensiensis var. ernestii (Rehder) Tang S.Liu
Abies beissneriana Rehder & E.H.Wilson
Abies ernestii Rehder
Abies recurvata subsp. ernestii (Rehder) Silba
Abies recurvata var. ernestii (Rehder) Rushforth

Abies chensiensis var. salouenensis (Bordères & Gaussen) Silba
Abies chensiensis subsp. salouenensis (Bordères & Gaussen) Rushforth
Abies ernestii var. salouenensis (Bordères & Gaussen) W.C.Cheng & L.K.Fu
Abies recurvata var. salouenensis (Bordères & Gaussen) C.T.Kuan
Abies salouenensis Bordères & Gaussen

Abies chensiensis var. yulongxueshanensis (Rushforth) Silba
Abies chensiensis subsp. yulongxueshanensis Rushforth

Distribution

The natural distribution of the Shensi fir is roughly bounded to the north by the Chinese provinces of Shaanxi and Gansu, and to the south by the Yunnan province. It most commonly grows in heights of 2300 to 3000 metres in regions with an annual precipitation between 1000 and 2000 mm.

Uses

The soft, light timber of the Shensi fir is finely grained, and is predominantly used as a construction material.

See also 

List of tallest trees

References

chensiensis
Plants described in 1892
Least concern plants
Trees of China
Flora of Arunachal Pradesh
Flora of Tibet
Taxonomy articles created by Polbot
Taxa named by Philippe Édouard Léon Van Tieghem